Mark Nicholas Fisher (born August 3, 1962) is an American politician. He is a Republican who represents district 27C in the Maryland House of Delegates, which covers parts of Calvert County. He previously represented district 27B from 2011 to 2015. He also hosts a podcast called Mark and the Millennials, which explores the divide between conservative millennials and the baby boomer generation.

Political positions

Education
In March 2019, Fisher introduced an amendment to the Maryland state budget that would restrict $1 million of the University System of Maryland budget until completion of a report to facilitate the exercise of First Amendment rights on campus. The amendment failed by a vote of 42-96.

In March 2020, Fisher introduced an amendment to the Blueprint for Maryland's Future (HB1300) that would allow students attending "failing schools" to transfer to an "alternative school" within the same county. His amendment was rejected by a vote of 41-93.

Environment
In February 2021, Fisher said that investing in the nuclear power industry could be a solution to the climate crisis, arguing that there is not enough solar or wind infrastructure to address the climate emergency. He advocated for nuclear power investments in the Climate Solutions Now Act of 2021.

In March 2021, Fisher voted against a bill that would prohibit stores from providing customers with plastic bags starting July 2022, arguing that the bill would increase costs for small businesses and transfer extra costs of paper bags onto customers. In the same month, Fisher introduced a bill that would have prevented elected officials at the state and local level from using the government’s electric charging stations without paying for it. Democrats on the House Environment and Transportation Committee rewrote his bill to allow state employees and local elected officials free access to the charging stations for their personal vehicles. The committee then voted 17-5 to approve the changes and brought the bill to the House floor for debate, where Fisher proposed an amendment that would revert the bill back to its original state. His amendment was rejected by a vote of 47-80.

Minimum wage
In March 2014, Fisher voted against a bill that would raise the state minimum wage to $10.10/hour. He also introduced an amendment to this bill that would exempt all businesses with 50 or fewer employees from the minimum wage increase, which would fail by a 45-88 vote.

In March 2019, Fisher voted against a bill that would raise the state minimum wage to $15/hour.

Nuclear energy
Fisher's district includes the Calvert Cliffs Nuclear Power Plant, Maryland's only nuclear power plant.

In March 2019, Fisher introduced legislation to include nuclear as a Tier 1 Fuel that could be used as part of the state's renewable portfolio. He later amended his bill to instead mandate a study on the future of the nuclear industry in Maryland, causing it to pass the House Economic Matters Committee by a vote of 20-1. His bill passed the House of Delegates by a vote of 102-34, but would not receive a vote in the state senate.

Taxes
In March 2020, Fisher introduced an amendment to House Bill 932, which would implement a sales tax on digital services, that would have exempted educational products from the tax on the basis that the generated revenue would be going to the Kirwan Commission’s education reform recommendations. The amendment failed along party lines.

Electoral history

References

Republican Party members of the Maryland House of Delegates
Living people
1962 births
Politicians from Baltimore
21st-century American politicians